Barnes & Noble Nook is a brand of electronic book readers developed by Barnes & Noble, including the application for third party devices.

Nook may also refer to:

eReader
 Barnes & Noble Nook 1st Edition (2009), a first generation E ink electronic book reader
 Nook Color (2010), a first generation LCD electronic book reader/Tablet
 Nook Simple Touch (2011), a second generation E ink electronic book reader
 Nook Tablet (2011), Barnes & Noble's second generation LCD electronic book reader/Tablet
 Nook HD (2012), Barnes & Noble's third generation LCD electronic book reader/Tablet
 Nook HD+ (2012), Barnes & Noble's third generation LCD electronic book reader/Tablet
 Samsung Galaxy Tab 4 Nook 7.0", Barnes & Noble's fourth generation LCD electronic book reader/Tablet
 Samsung Galaxy Tab 4 Nook 10.1", Barnes & Noble's fourth generation LCD electronic book reader/Tablet
 Samsung Galaxy Tab S2 Nook, Barnes & Noble's fifth generation LCD electronic book reader/Tablet

Places
 Nook, Northumberland, a former civil parish in England
 Nook, Tasmania, Australia
 Acres Nook, a suburb of Kidsgrove in the Borough of Newcastle-under-Lyme, England
 Daisy Nook, a country park in the town of Failsworth, in the Metropolitan Borough of Oldham, Greater Manchester, England
 Donna Nook, a bombing range on the coast of Lincolnshire, England
 Salendine Nook, a district of Huddersfield in the English county of West Yorkshire
 Teddy's Nook, a house built by Henry Pease at Saltburn-by-the-Sea, Yorkshire, England
 Urlay Nook, a village within the borough of Stockton-on-Tees and the ceremonial county of County Durham, England
 Wall Nook, a small village in County Durham, England

People
 Nook Logan (born 1979), American baseball player

Arts, entertainment, and media
Nook (album), 1992 second album by German band The Notwist
 "Nook", a Season 2 episode of the science-fiction TV series Lexx
Tom Nook, fictional shopkeeper in Nintendo's Animal Crossing series

Other uses
 Nook (Latin noca), an obsolete land measure equal to a quarter of a virgate

See also
 Nanook (disambiguation)
 Nuk (disambiguation), several places in Iran